Marloth Nature Reserve is a nature reserve in Swellendam Local Municipality, Western Cape, South Africa. It conserves the central Langeberg mountains, between the towns of Swellendam, Ashton, Barrydale and Suurbraak. The reserve includes the Clock Peaks, two prominent landmarks near Swellendam.

The reserve is 14,123 ha in extent and is managed together with another 16,532 ha of privately owned proclaimed mountain catchment land. The reserve's office is approximately 15 km from Swellendam and adjacent to the Swellendam State Forest.

It is named after Rudolf Marloth, a South African botanist.

See also 
 Protected areas of South Africa
 South African National Parks

Nature reserves in South Africa
Provincial nature reserves of the Western Cape
Protected areas established in 1928